Wilhelm von Carpelan may refer to:

 Wilhelm Carpelan (1778-1829), Swedish government official for postal service
 Wilhelm Maximilian Carpelan (1787-1830), Finnish-Swedish military officer, draftsman, surveyor and cartographer

See also
 Finnish transport vessel Wilhelm Carpelan Finnish transport vessel